The 2009 Price LeBlanc Lexus Pro Tennis Classic was a professional tennis tournament played on outdoor hard courts. It was part of the 2009 ATP Challenger Tour. It took place in Baton Rouge, Louisiana, United States from April 6, 2009, to April 12, 2009.

Singles entrants

Seeds

 Rankings are as of March 23, 2009.

Other entrants
The following players received wildcards into the singles main draw:
  Lester Cook
  Jarmere Jenkins
  Alex Kuznetsov
  Rajeev Ram

The following players received entry from the qualifying draw:
  Ričardas Berankis
  Frédéric Niemeyer
  Vladimir Obradović
  Daniel Yoo

Champions

Men's singles

 Benjamin Becker def.  Rajeev Ram, 6–2, 3–6, 6–4

Men's doubles

 Rajeev Ram /  Bobby Reynolds def.  Harsh Mankad /  Scott Oudsema, 6–3, 6–7(6), 10–3

References
2009 Draws
Official website
ITF search 

Price LeBlanc Lexus Pro Tennis Classic
Tennis tournaments in the United States
Tennis in Louisiana
Baton Rouge Pro Tennis Classic